Gundemaro Pinióliz (died ), was a noble from the Kingdom of León, the ancestor of one of the most important Asturian lineages of the Middle Ages, and most likely the great-grandfather of Jimena Díaz, wife of Rodrigo Díaz de Vivar, el Cid.

Biographical sketch 

He was the son of Piniolo Gundemáriz and Jimena Vélaz, daughter of count Vela Núñez and his wife Totilde and sister of count Fruela Vélaz. Gundemaro had several siblings, including a sister, Elvira, married to Vermudo Vélaz, ancestors of count Suero Vermúdez. His paternal uncle was Count Suero, a notorious rebel.

He appears frequently in medieval charters, confirming royal documents as well as in family transactions and donations. In March 976, he confirmed a donation made by his uncle count Fruela Vélaz to the Cathedral de Oviedo, as Gundimaro Pinioli armiger, that is, the standard-bearer of King Ramiro III of León. During a period of fifteen years he served in the curia regis of King Bermudo III of León and in March 996 appears for the first time with the title of count.

Count Gundemaro owned many properties in Oviedo, some purchased and others donated by kings Ramiro and Bermudo. For his baptism, Queen Velasquita Ramírez, possibly his godmother, gave him real estate properties He also owned land and villas in Teverga. With his wife Muniadona he made many donations to religious establishments, especially to the Monastery of San Vicente de Oviedo and to the city's cathedral. He and his wife Muniadona founded several monasteries, including San Miguel de Trevías in 1000 and also the Monastery of Santa Marina.

He last appears in medieval charters on 29 September 1011 and must have died between that date and 18 July of the following year when his widow Muniadona made a donation to the cathedral mentioning "" (Roughly: "in steadfast memory of my husband, Gundemar").

Marriage and issue 
The name of his first wife is not recorded. They were the parents of:

 Gontrodo Gundemáriz (died in February 1075). Gontrodo was a nun and probably the abbess of the Monastery of San Pelayo in Oviedo. On 22 December 1036, her stepmother Muniadona and her half-brother Fernando, gave her four monasteries, including San Salvador de Taule (or Tol) which years later gave rise to a legal dispute between the descendants of count Gundemaro and the Cathedral of Oviedo. The donation made by Muniadona and her son Fernando was confirmed by several members of the royal house, including infanta Cristina Bermúdez, daughter of King Bermudo II of León and his first wife queen Velasquita Ramírez; Teresa Bermúdez, also daughter of Bermudo II and his second wife Elvira García, as well as Jimena, daughter of King Alfonso V of León. In her will, executed on 2 February 1075 in articulo mortis Gontrodo mentions her father, step-mother, and brother Fernando.

Gundemaro appears in 991 for the first time with his second wife Muniadona, whose parentage is unknown and who must have married at a very young age since she is still recorded as living in 1045. Two children were born of this marriage: 
 Fernando Gundemáriz (died after 1063). In May 1063, Count Fernando made a donation to the Monastery of San Salvador de Taule of some villas which he had from his parents, Gundemaro and Muniadona, and also from his brother Pelayo who seems to have been dead by that date. He donated several villas, including Sierra de la Reina which he had received from Queen Velasquita Ramiréz when he was baptized. He married Muniadona Ordóñez, daughter of Ordoño Ramírez and great-granddaughter of count Gonzalo Menéndez  He was apparently the grandfather of Jimena Díaz, the wife of Rodrigo Díaz de Vivar, El Cid.  Jimena was daughter of Diego Fernández de Oviedo and his wife Cristina, whom recent reconstructions make daughter of Count Fernando, though others see Diego himself as Count Fernando's child.
 Pelayo Gundemáriz (died before 1063).

Notes

References

Bibliography

 
 
 
 

 
 
 

1012 deaths
Counts of Spain
Year of birth unknown
History of Asturias